Rugby league is the most popular team sport played in the Cook Islands. Rugby league is recognised as the national sport of the country.

Popularity

History
Officially the club rugby league competition commenced in 1980. The first international match was played against Niue at the 1986 Pacific Cup, which was hosted in Rarotonga and also included teams from Samoa, Tonga, NZ Maori and Tokelau. In the mid 1990s rugby league received significant funding through the SuperLeague organisation. Traditionally, much of the rugby league played by Cook Islanders has been in Australia and New Zealand where there are strong Cook Island populations.

In more recent times, Cook Islands rugby league has received a major boost through the involvement of former professional rugby league players Kevin Iro and Matt Rua - both native Cook Islanders - in the form of selector and defensive coach for the national side. Both players represented New Zealand internationally and played many NRL games.

Rugby league is the national sport and the most popular sport in the Cook Islands.

Staff
 President, Cook Islands Rugby League: Charles Carlson
 Selectors: Kevin Iro, Charles Carlson, Ina Konito and No'ora Samuela
 RLIF Representative: Kevin Iro
 Head Coach: Tony Iro
 Defensive Coach: Matt Rua
 Attacking Coach: Kevin Iro

Current players of Cook Islands descent
NRL
 Alex Glenn 
 Charnze Nicoll-Klokstad
 Jordan Rapana
 Josh Papalii
 Dylan Napa
 Karmichael Hunt
 Sione Katoa
 Brandon Smith
 Valentine Holmes
 Esan Marsters
 Francis Molo
 Marata Niukore
 Troy Dargan
 Steven Marsters
 Joseph Manu
 James Tamou
Super League
 Valentine Holmes
 Drury Low
 Jordan Rapana
 Zane Tetevano
 Dominique Peyroux
 Adam Tangata

Notable players

 Kevin Iro
 Adam Watene
 Matt Rua
 John Whittaker
 Tiri Toa
 Meti Noovao
 Riki Cowan
 Tony Iro
 Karmichael Hunt
 Denvour Johnston
 Ali Davys
 Aaron Cannings
 Karl Temata
 Ben Vaeau
 George Tuakura
 Frank Watene
 Kane Epati
 Leroy Joe
 Tyrone Pau

Competition

The domestic Cook Islands rugby league competition begins in early February on a yearly basis. The Tournament is arguably the biggest sporting competition in the Cook Islands with hundreds attending games on the Islands of Rarotonga and Aitutaki. Grand Final weekend builds the biggest hype among supporters of every team ranging from its junior levels, reserve grade and the main A grade (Premier level).

Men Teams
Titikaveka Bulldogs
Tupapa Maraerenga Panthers
Avatiu/Nikao Eels
Takuvaine Warriors 
Arorangi Bears
Aitutaki Sharks (Premier Squad Only)
Ngatangiia/Matavera Sea Eagles

Winners
1992 Ngatangiia/Matavera Sea Eagles
1993 Ngatangiia/Matavera Sea Eagles
1994 Ngatangiia/Matavera Sea Eagles
1995 Ngatangiia/Matavera Sea Eagles
1996 Ngatangiia/Matavera Sea Eagles
1997 Ngatangiia/Matavera Sea Eagles
1998 Ngatangiia/Matavera Sea Eagles 
1999 Avatiu/Nikao Eels 
2000 Ngatangiia/Matavera Sea Eagles
2001 Titikaveka Bulldogs 
2002 Titikaveka Bulldogs 
2003 Arorangi Bears 
2004 Avatiu/Nikao Eels 
2005 Tupapa Maraerenga Panthers
2006 Avatiu/Nikao Eels 
2007 Avatiu/Nikao Eels
2008 Tupapa Maraerenga Panthers
2009 Tupapa Maraerenga Panthers
2010 Avatiu/Nikao Eels
2011 Avatiu/Nikao Eels
2012 Titikaveka Bulldogs
2013 Tupapa Maraerenga Panthers
2014 Tupapa Maraerenga Panthers 
2015 Avatiu/Nikao Eels
2016 Avatiu/Nikao Eels
2017 Titivakeva Bulldogs 
2018 Tupapa Maraerenga Panthers 
2019 Ngatangiia/Matavera Sea Eagles 
2020 (Season Suspended due to COVID) Ngatangiia/Matavera Sea Eagles retain Premiership
2021 Tupapa Maraerenga Panthers  
2022 (Season Suspended due to COVID in the country) Tupapa Maraerenga Panthers retain Premiership

Women's Teams
Titikaveka Lady Bulldogs
Tupapa Maraerenga Lady Panthers
Avatiu/Nikao Lady Eels
Arorangi Lady Bears

Winners
2021 Titikaveka Lady Bulldogs
2022 (Season Suspended due to COVID in the country) Titikaveka Lady Bulldogs retain Premiership

The National Team

Other representative sides
In 2005 the Cook Islands Rugby League Avaiki XIII Tri Series was played between three Cook Island sides (Australian Cook Island Style, NZ Cooks and a Resident XIII).  The winners of the series were the Australian Cook Islands Style team. This was used to select the national side that drew a three match series with the New Zealand Māori

Results
NZ Cooks v Resident XIII, 25 November 2005

Australian Cook Island Style 26 NZ Cooks 14

Australian Cook Island Style 24 Residents XIII 18, 18 November 2005 changed

References